CBRM may refer to:

 CBRM-FM, a radio retransmitter (98.3 FM) licensed to Medicine Hat, Alberta, Canada, retransmitting CBR
 Cape Breton Regional Municipality, Nova Scotia
 Chillicothe-Brunswick Rail Maintenance Authority
 Condition Based Risk Management, a schema used to manage business running investment
 Certified Business Relationship Manager, a professional designation offered by the Business Relationship Management Institute (BRMI)